The 2005 WNBL Finals was the postseason tournament of the WNBL's 2004–05 season. The Dandenong Rangers were the defending champions and they successfully defended their title, defeating the Sydney Uni Flames 52–47.

Standings

Finals

Semi-finals

(1) Dandenong Rangers vs. (2) Bulleen Boomers

(3) Sydney Uni Flames vs. (4) Adelaide Lightning

Preliminary final

(2) Bulleen Boomers vs. (3) Sydney Uni Flames

Grand Final

(1) Dandenong Rangers vs. (3) Sydney Uni Flames

Rosters

References 

2005 Finals
2004-05
Women's National Basketball League Finals
2004–05 in Australian basketball
Aus
basketball
basketball